Diego de Muros (died 1507) was a Roman Catholic prelate who served as Bishop of Islas Canarias (1496–1507). He was one of three bishops of Spain of the same name who served contemporaneously, the others being Diego de Muros (bishop of Ciudad Rodrigo) and Diego de Muros (bishop of Oviedo).

Biography
On 27 June 1496, Diego de Muros was appointed during the papacy of Pope Alexander VI as Bishop of Islas Canarias. He served as Bishop of Islas Canarias until his death in 1507.

See also 
Diego de Muros (bishop of Ciudad Rodrigo)
Diego de Muros (bishop of Oviedo)

References

External links and additional sources
 (for Chronology of Bishops)
 (for Chronology of Bishops)

15th-century Roman Catholic bishops in the Kingdom of Aragon
16th-century Roman Catholic bishops in Spain
Bishops appointed by Pope Alexander VI
1507 deaths